Hirtaeschopalaea albolineata is a species of beetle in the family Cerambycidae. It was described by Maurice Pic in 1925. It is known from India, Vietnam, Borneo and Laos. Its body is typically black and yellowish brown with a gray and white belly.

References

Lamiinae
Beetles described in 1925